George Kenneth "Ken" Bell (July 30, 1914 – June 26, 2000) was a Canadian photographer who served with the Canadian armed forces during the Second World War. As a Lieutenant in the Canadian Army Film and Photo Unit, he participated in the Normandy Landings, disembarking at Juno Beach on June 6, 1944 with the Highland Light Infantry of Canada. Later he went on to photograph and record the liberation of France, Belgium and the Netherlands, and finally documented the occupation of Germany. After the war he had a successful career as a professional photographer, and  published a number of books including Not in Vain, a collection of photographs showing the changes which had taken place in Europe since the end of the war.

Early life
George Kenneth Bell was born in Toronto, Ontario, on July 30, 1914. He was the second son and the fourth of six children born to carpenter Charles Bell (1881–c. 1958) and Edith Bell, immigrants from Yorkshire, England. Charles Bell emigrated to Canada in 1906.   The family lived at 1211 Dufferin St, Toronto.

World War II

When Canada joined the war against Nazi Germany in 1939, Bell was posted to Ottawa as a public relations photographer. Later, he joined the Canadian Army Film and Photo Unit, with the rank of lieutenant. Along with a number of other photographers, Bell would go on to document Canada's participation in World War II.

The Canadian Army played a major role in the 1944 Normandy landings, landing at Juno beach, somewhat to the south of the previous raid at Dieppe in 1942. Like his better known American contemporary Robert Capa, Bell took part in the first day of the D-Day operation, disembarking at Juno Beach on June 6, 1944 with The Highland Light Infantry of Canada (now known as the Royal Highland Fusiliers of Canada), part of the 9th brigade. The 9th brigade was not in the first assault wave, but landed later in the morning and advanced through the lead brigades, which had taken heavy casualties.

Many of Bell's photographs were taken in colour - a first for the Canadian Army - though these did not become public until around twenty years later. They are the only surviving colour photographs of the Normandy Landings.

Members of the CFPU were often in the front line, and sometimes even ahead of it. During the liberation of Dieppe in 1944, as the Manitoba Dragoons awaited orders to advance, members of the CFPU including Ken Bell and Brian O'Regan were the first Allied servicemen to enter the town.

Bell's war photographs – taken with a Rolleiflex camera – are housed by the Library and Archives of Canada in Ottawa, Ontario. Many of the original negatives of his photographs are held by the Canadian Forces Photo Unit and the City of Toronto Archives.

Ken Bell's brother William Ernest Bell also served in the war; he volunteered for the Royal Canadian Air Force in 1941 and served in 440 Squadron flying Hawker Typhoons in the last months of the war.

Post-war career
After the war Bell had a successful career as a professional photographer, publishing a number of collections of photographs taken during and after the war.

He also continued with an active role in the Canadian Army as an Officer Commanding of the Royal Regiment of Canada and then as the regiment's Honorary Lieutenant-Colonel.

In 1953 he published Curtain Call, a collection of photographs in which he "tried to show the changes brought by man and nature in the 5 years since VE day". This was followed in 1973 by Not in Vain, published by the University of Toronto Press, a collection of photographs taken partly during the war, and partly 25 years later when he returned to the same locations in France, Belgium and the Netherlands.

During the 1970s he worked as a freelance photographer, specialising in fashion, food and work in the advertising industry. He also had a long professional association with the National Ballet of Canada.

In 1990, he collaborated with Desmond Morton to publish a book detailing the history of the Royal Canadian Military Institute on the occasion of the Institute's
100th Anniversary.

Family life
Colonel Bell was twice married. His first was to Marion "Molly" Alice Bell, with whom he adopted two daughters, Sue and Karen. After Molly's death he married Mary Lea Kenly of Toronto.

His nephew Richard Williams was an animator.

He died on June 26, 2000, in Gibsons, British Columbia, Canada.

Awards
He was twice awarded the Photographer of the Year award by the society of Professional Photographers of Canada, in 1965 and 1966. In 1986 he received the Canadian Association of Photographers and Illustrators Lifetime Achievement Award.

Published works
Curtain Call, Intaglio Gravure Limited 1953
Not in Vain, University of Toronto Press, 1973, ASIN: B001PQT32Y
100 years: The Royal Canadian Regiment, 1883-1983, Collier Macmillan Canada, 1983 ASIN: B000KFWQ16
The Way We Were, University of Toronto Press, 1988 
Royal Canadian Military Institute: 100 Years 1890-1990, Morton and Bell, 1990.

Gallery

References
Bell, Ken Not in Vain, University of Toronto Press, 1973 
Chartrand, Rene, & Volstad, Ronald, p.21, Canadian Forces in World War II Retrieved September 2011
Ford, Ken, and Peter Dennis, Caen 1944: Montgomery's Break-out Attempt  Retrieved September 2011
Ford, Ken, p.28, Falaise 1944: Death of an Army Retrieved September 2011
Hunter, Martin Young Hunting - a memoir ECW Press, Toronto, Ontario, 2008 
O'Regan, Bryan, Camera Commandos and Reminiscences of D-Day Normandy, E Book, 2007, 
O'Regan, Bryan,  Shooters, documentary film about the CFPU.
 UK census records, 1911.
Zuehlke, Mark, p.182, Breakout from Juno: First Canadian Army and the Normandy Campaign Retrieved September 2011

Notes

External links
Not in Vain at Amazon.com
"Ken Bell" at Encyclopædia Britannica''
Ken Bell fonds (R5529) at Library and Archives Canada
List of former recipients of the Professional Photographers of Canada Photographer of the Year award 
www.Junobeach.org
Ken Bell at www.canadianfilm.com Retrieved 12 April 2022

War photographers
1914 births
2000 deaths
Canadian photojournalists
Artists from Toronto
Canadian Army officers
Canadian Army personnel of World War II
Canadian military personnel from Ontario